The Potzberg Tower is a 53.5-metre-high lookout and transmitting tower on the Potzberg at Föckelberg, Rhineland-Palatinate, Germany. It was built between 13 October 1951 and 2 December 1951 and consists of a 35-metre-high bricked tower with a footprint of 4 by 7 metres, on which are 18.5-metre-high radio towers. The tower was inaugurated on 13 July 1952.

See also
List of towers

External links
 https://web.archive.org/web/20020719164527/http://www.potzberg.de/turmbau.htm
 http://www.skyscraperpage.com/diagrams/?b47293

Radio masts and towers in Germany
Observation towers in Rhineland-Palatinate
1951 establishments in West Germany
Towers completed in 1951